Tylers Common, also known as Upminster Common, is common land in the London Borough of Havering.

References

Parks and open spaces in the London Borough of Havering
Common land in London